James Preston Pennington (born January 22, 1949) is an American musician, known primarily as the guitarist and co-lead vocalist of the country pop band Exile. Pennington was one of the early members and one of the lead singers of the group until departing in 1990. After leaving Exile, he signed to MCA Records as a solo artist. There, he released three singles and one album, Whatever It Takes, in 1991. Pennington re-established the band in 1995, together with guitarist Les Taylor.

Discography

Albums

Singles

References

1949 births
American country singer-songwriters
Exile (American band) members
Living people
Country musicians from Kentucky
MCA Records artists
People from Berea, Kentucky
Singer-songwriters from Kentucky